San Rafael is a town and municipality in Antioquia Department, Colombia. Part of the subregion of Eastern Antioquia.

The town was founded in 1864 by a group of miners who were attracted to the abundance of gold in the region. It is also rich in water resources.

See also
St Raphael's Church

External links

References

Municipalities of Antioquia Department